Schaumburg Community Consolidated School District 54 operates 21 elementary schools, five junior high schools  and one combined K-8 school based in Schaumburg, Cook County, Illinois, USA, a suburb of Chicago.

It serves Schaumburg and portions of Hoffman Estates, Hanover Park, Elk Grove Village and Roselle. In 2010 it had 14,218 students.

The district has 1,420 teachers (FTEs) serving 15,647 students.

 it is the largest elementary school district in Illinois.

Curriculum
In 2001 the district began a dual-language Japanese-English program, the only such program in the state's public schools, using immersion and having both languages used each day, with portions taught by native speakers of their respective languages. The Japanese Chamber of Commerce and Industry of Chicago and Omron fund the program. In 2010 there were 183 students in the elementary level and 22 students at the middle school level. The district did not alter the program during budget cuts for the 2010-2011 school year. In 2010 the first graduates of the program graduated, numbering 11.

Schools

Note: Based on 2019-20 school year data

References

External links
Community Consolidated School District 54 Website
District Report Cards

School districts in Cook County, Illinois
Schaumburg, Illinois
Hoffman Estates, Illinois